Ladakh district was a district of the Jammu and Kashmir state of India until 1 July 1979 when it was divided into Leh district and Kargil district.

See also 

 Ladakh

Former districts of India